is a Buddhist temple located in the city of Kakuda, Miyagi Prefecture, Japan.

Kōzō-ji was founded in 819 AD by Tokuitsu, a monk of the Hōsso sect. It was restored in 1177 by the wife of Fujiwara Shuei, who erected the Amida-dō, which is the oldest building in the prefecture, and one of the very few Heian period structures remaining. In 1908 it was designated an Important Cultural Property.

The  wooden statue of Amida Nyorai seated on a lotus throne (1177), constructed using the yoseki-zukuri technique, was designated an Important Cultural Property in 1927.

See also

Pure Land Buddhism
Japanese Buddhist architecture
Japanese sculpture
Important Cultural Properties of Japan
Northern Fujiwara

References

Buddhist temples in Miyagi Prefecture
Important Cultural Properties of Japan
Kakuda, Miyagi